Apsheronsky District is an administrative district (raion), one of the thirty-eight in Krasnodar Krai, Russia. As a municipal division, it is incorporated as Apsheronsky Municipal District. It is located in the south of the krai. Its administrative center is the town of Apsheronsk. Population:  The population of Apsheronsk accounts for 40.7% of the district's total population.

Transportation
Apsheronsk narrow-gauge railway is the largest mountain railway of its type in Russia.

References

Notes

Sources

Districts of Krasnodar Krai